The Puke Puke Express was a logging railway with a gauge of probably  near Puke Puke in Oroua County in New Zealand.

Puke Puke was a sawmilling settlement in Oroua County, close to Puke Puke Lagoon, between Himatangi Beach and Tangimoana. It was set up from nine wooden cottages, probably prefabricated, complete with windows along the railway track in a clearing of the native bush. Both horses and locomotives were used for haulage of logs on railway trucks.

Photos

References

Weblinks 
 National Library of New Zealand

Rail transport in Manawatū-Whanganui
Logging railways in New Zealand
Forestry in New Zealand
3 ft 6 in gauge railways in New Zealand